Isauli is a constituency of the Uttar Pradesh Legislative Assembly covering the city of Isauli in the Sultanpur district of Uttar Pradesh, India.

Isauli is one of five assembly constituencies in the Sultanpur Lok Sabha constituency. Since 2008, this assembly constituency is numbered 187 amongst 403 constituencies.

Election results

2022

2017

References

External links
 

Assembly constituencies of Uttar Pradesh
Sultanpur district